This is a list of members of the Executive Council of New Hampshire. At present, this list is only complete from 1901 onward; people who served prior to 1901 may still be missing.

A
Joseph J. Acorace, 1969–71
Albert Annett, 1909–11
Arthur T. Appleton, 1939–41

B
Daniel W. Badger, 1913–15
George W. Barnes, 1921–23
Jesse M. Barton, 1925–27 
Cyprien J. Belanger, 1929–31
Loring B. Bodwell, 1901–03
C. Edward Bourassa, 1949–53
Henry W. Boutwell, 1909–11
John P. Bowler, 1963–65
Charles H. Brackett, 1933–35
Roger E. Brassard, 1957–63 
John F. Bridges, 1973–75 
Frank P. Brown, 1907–09 
John H. Brown, 1918–21
Ora A. Brown, 1927–29
Raymond S. Burton, 1977–79, 1981–2013

C
William P. Cahill, 1985–87 
Charles E. Carroll, 1933–35 
Edward H. Carroll, 1917–18
Solon A. Carter, 1915–17
John B. Cavanaugh, 1915–17
Robert N. Chamberlain, 1901–03
Romeo J. Champagne, 1953–57
John P.H. Chandler, Jr., 1953–59 
Guy E. Chesley, 1927–29
Stephen W. Clow, 1919–21
Thomas Colantuono, 1999–2001 
Oscar P. Cole, 1923–25
Alfred A. Collins, 1903–05
Thomas J. Conway, 1923–25
Burt R. Cooper, 1935–37
Michael J. Cryans, 2019–21
Edward H. Cullen, 1967–69
Lynn Cutler, 1935–37

D
Charles M. Dale, 1937–39
Louis D'Allesandro, 1975–81 
William S. Davis, 1931–33
Harold K. Davison, 1939–41
Dudley W. Dudley, 1977–85 
Charles T. Durell, 1955–57

E
John A. Edgerly, 1925–27
Royal H. Edgerly, 1967–69 
Thomas Entwistle, 1911–13

F
Harold G. Fairbanks, 1941–45 
James C. Farmer, 1935–37
Philip H. Faulkner, 1923–25
James G. Fellows, 1909–11
Franklin Flanders, 1947–49
Howard R. Flanders, 1951–55 
Fred H. Fletcher, 1955–59, 1963–65, 1967–69
Charles M. Floyd, 1905–07
William H.C. Follansby, 1907–09
Alonzo M. Foss, 1909–11
Stephen A. Frost, 1923–25

G
Ted Gatsas, 2019–present
Louis Georgopoulos, 1981–87 
Frank L. Gerrish, 1927–29
John M. Gile, 1911–13
Lewis G. Gilman, 1913–15
Paul J. Gingras, 1947–49
Windsor H. Goodnow, 1919–21 
Herbert I. Goss, 1918–19
Miles W. Gray, 1917–18 
Henry Francis Green 1899–1901
Charles H. Greenleaf, 1905–07 
Benjamin F. Greer, 1911–13
Judd Gregg, 1979–81
Ruth L. Griffin, 1987–2007

H
Fred W. Hall, Jr., 1963–65 
John A. Hammond, 1925–27
Bob Hayes, 1993–95 
James H. Hayes, 1959–77 
Philip C. Heald, 1943–45
Oren V. Henderson, 1939–41 
Charles H. Hersey, 1901–03
Lyle E. Hersom, 1971–77
Albert Hislop, 1921–23
Paul W. Hobbs, 1947–49
Beverly Hollingworth, 2007–2011
Harry L. Holmes, 1929–31
Harry D. Hopkins, 1929–31
Joseph Woodbury Howard, 1905–07
Charles B. Hoyt, 1931–33
Albert H. Hunt, 1927–29
Frank Huntress, 1915–17

J
Andrew Jarvis, 1961–63
Stephen S. Jewett, 1907–09

K
Frank E. Kaley, 1903–05
Thomas H. Keenan, 1959–61
A. Crosby Kennett, 1903–05 
Joseph Kenney, 2014–19; 2021–present
George H. Keough, 1953–55

L
Edward G. Leach, 1905–07
William H. Leith, 1929–31 
Thomas J. Leonard, 1935–37, 1945–47
Harry T. Lord, 1911–13
Samuel A. Lovejoy, 1925–27
Alvin A. Lucier, 1937–39
C. Wesley Lyons, 1953–55

M
James C. MacLeod, 1933–35, 1945–47
Robert L. Mallat, Jr., 1965–67
Albert R. Martineau, 1943–45 
Donald G. Matson, 1947–49
Paul M. Mayette, 1979–81 
George W. McGregor, 1913–15
William B. McInnis, 1931–33
Malcolm McLane, 1977–83 
Harry Merrill, 1929–31
Lyford A. Merrow, 1909–11 
Parker M. Merrow, 1955–57
Charles M. Mills, 1949–51
William A. Molloy, 1941–43
Carl E. Morin, 1947–49 
Arthur E. Morneau, 1925–27
Arthur P. Morrill, 1923–25 
Francis P. Murphy, 1933–35
Thomas A. Murray, 1937–43

N
Albert W. Noone, 1913–15
James A. Normand, 1997–99 
George T. Noyes, 1951–53

O
Daniel A. O'Brien, 1959–61

P
Chris Pappas, 2013–2019
Jared Perkins, 1846–48
John W. Perkins, 1943–45
Debora Pignatelli, 2005–11, 2013–15, 2019–21
Peter R. Poirier, 1945–47 
James J. Powers, 1931–33
Albert J. Precourt, 1927–29
Russell Prescott 2017–21

Q
Austin F. Quinney, 1965–67

R
Seth M. Richards, 1903–05
Earl A. Rinker III, 1987–97
Fred S. Roberts, 1921–23 
George D. Roberts, 1941–43
Philip A. Robertson, 1961–63, 1967–69
George Hamilton Rolfe, 1937–41
Alphonse Roy, 1933–37

S
George L. Sadler, 1921–23
Daniel St. Hilaire, 2011–13
Ansel N. Sanborn, 1941–43 
William H. Sawyer, 1913–15
John Scammon, 1915–17
James Frank Seavey, 1903–05
John Shea, 2007–2011
Emile Simard, 1963–67 
Scott C.W. Simpson, 1943–45
Harry P. Smart, 1949–51
J. Guy Smart, 1949–51
Stephen W. Smith, 1969–71 
Peter Spaulding, 1995–2007
Charles F. Stafford, 1949–53
Bernard A. Streeter, Jr., 1969–79, 1981–2001
Joshua Studley, 1945–47
William A. Styles, 1965–67
Christopher Sununu, 2011–2017
William D. Swart, 1917–19

T
James B. Tennant, 1901–03
Renfrew A. Thomson, 1951–53, 1957–59
Fred S. Towle, 1905–07
George E. Trudel, 1921–23
Edmund E. Truesdell, 1901–03
George H. Turner, 1911–13

U
James Duncan Upham, 1907–09

V
 Colin Van Ostern, 2013–2017
 Charles W. Varney, 1917–19
 Moise Verrette, 1917–19
 Herbert B. Viall, 1907–09
 Andru Volinsky, 2017–2021

W
Fred T. Wadleigh, 1931–33
James B. Wallace, 1915–17
John S. Walsh, 1971–73 
Harold Weeks, 1959–63
John G. Welpley, 1919–21
Robert E. Whalen, 1969–75
David K. Wheeler, 2001–05, 2011–13, 2015–19, 2021–present
Virgil D. White, 1937–39
Arthur G. Whittemore, 1919–21
Charles H. Whittier, 1957–59 
Raymond Wieczorek, 2002–13
George Albert Wooster, 1945–47

Y
Leon G. Yeaton, 1975–77

External links
Former Councilors, State of New Hampshire Executive Council

Executive Council